Mount Moriah is a town in the Canadian province of Newfoundland and Labrador. The town had a population of 700 in the Canada 2021 Census.

Demographics 

See also 
 Bay of Islands
 List of cities and towns in Newfoundland and Labrador

References 

Towns in Newfoundland and Labrador